The Producers Guild of America Award for Best Limited or Anthology Series Television, also known as the David L. Wolper Award for Outstanding Producer of Limited or Anthology Series Television, is an annual award given by the Producers Guild of America. It was first awarded at the 30th Annual Producers Guild Awards after the guild announced to split the award for Outstanding Producer of Long-Form Television into two: this accolade and the award for Outstanding Producer of Streamed or Televised Movies.

Winners and nominees

2010s

2020s

Total awards by network
 HBO – 2
 FX – 1
 Hulu – 1
 Netflix – 1

Total nominations by network
 HBO – 7
 Netflix – 7
 Hulu – 4
 Amazon Prime Video – 2
 Disney+ – 2
 FX – 2
 Showtime – 1

References

Limited Series Television